The Perna are a Hindu caste found mainly in the state of Haryana in India.

Origin 
The Perna were a nomadic tribe, referred to as vagrant by British ethnographers, similar in background to the Nat and Bazigar communities.  They were said to be a sub-group of the Dom community. As a semi-nomadic community which was alleged to be involved with prostitution.

Present circumstances 
The Perna are now a settled community and provide the bulk of the agricultural labourers in Haryana. A small number have been given land, and form a community of settled agriculturists. A significant number have also started to migrate to the towns and cities of Haryana, where they are employed mainly in the construction industry. Like other Dom groups, their economic condition is precarious. The community has been accorded scheduled caste status.

The Perna are endogamous, and there is no inter marriage with neighbouring Dom groups like the Nat and Bazigar. Like other North Indian Hindu communities, they practice clan and village exogamy. They speak Haryanvi, and are found mainly in the districts of Rohtak, Gurgaon, Faridabad, and Sirsa.

References 

Dom in India
Social groups of Haryana
Scheduled Tribes of India
Scheduled Castes of Haryana